The 1985 Copa del Rey was the 49th edition of the Spanish basketball Cup. It was organized by the ACB and its Final Eight was played in Badalona, in the Pavelló Club Joventut Badalona on 27 and 28 November 1984.

This edition was played by the two first qualified teams of the 1984–85 ACB first stage.

Qualified teams

Group Odd

|}

Group Even

|}

Bracket

Final

References

External links
Boxscores at ACB.com 
Linguasport

Copa del Rey de Baloncesto
1984–85 in Spanish basketball